Alejandro Avruj is an Argentine Conservative rabbi. He was the president of NCI-Emanu El, a Jewish community established in 1943 by Jews that escaped from the Holocaust. He resigned in 2013, after disagreements with deputy Sergio Bergman.

References

Argentine Conservative rabbis
Living people
Year of birth missing (living people)